Trichilia ornithothera is a species of plant in the family Meliaceae. It is found in Ivory Coast and Ghana. It is threatened by habitat loss.

References

ornithothera
Vulnerable plants
Flora of Ivory Coast
Flora of Ghana
Taxonomy articles created by Polbot